Mehdi Hasan may refer to:

 Mehdi Hasan (born 1979), British-American journalist
 Mehdi Hasan (Pakistani journalist) (1937–2022), Pakistani journalist
 Mehdi Hasan (Indian cricketer) (born 1990), an Indian cricketer
 Mohamed Mehdi Hasan (born 1971), Bangladeshi Olympic sprinter
 Mahdi Hasan (1936–2013), the prominent Indian anatomist
 Mehdi Hassan (1927–2012), Pakistani ghazal singer